Theodore Guese (January 24, 1872 – April 8, 1951) was a Major League Baseball pitcher for the 1901 Cincinnati Reds.

External links

1872 births
1951 deaths
Major League Baseball pitchers
Baseball players from Ohio
Cincinnati Reds players
New Castle Quakers players
Detroit Tigers (Western League) players
Fort Wayne Indians players
Youngstown Little Giants players
Marion Glass Blowers players
Indianapolis Hoosiers (minor league) players
Little Rock Travelers players
New Orleans Pelicans (baseball) players
Montgomery Senators players
Montgomery Climbers players
People from New Bremen, Ohio